Horacio Ramírez (born November 24, 1979) is a Mexican-American baseball pitcher. He is currently the bullpen coach for Team México in the 2023 World Baseball Classic. His parents emigrated from Jalostotitlán, Jalisco, México. He played in Major League Baseball (MLB) for the Atlanta Braves, Seattle Mariners, Chicago White Sox and Los Angeles Angels of Anaheim and in the KBO League for the Kia Tigers.

Baseball career

Atlanta Braves
At the end of his rookie season, he was selected to the Baseball Digest All-Star Rookie team. While initially thought to be a minor injury, Ramírez was not activated until September 26.

In , Ramírez finished with a record of 11–9 and an ERA of 4.63 in 33 games (32 starts), pitching over 200 innings for the first time in his career.

Seattle Mariners
On December 6, 2006, the Braves traded Ramírez to the Seattle Mariners for right-handed relief pitcher, Rafael Soriano. In his lone season with Seattle, he posted a record of 8–7, but had an ERA of 7.16 in 20 starts.

On March 12, Ramírez was released by the Mariners.

Kansas City Royals
On May 21, 2008, Ramírez signed a minor league deal with the Kansas City Royals. He pitched in 15 games for the Royals out of the bullpen, going 1–1 with a 2.59 ERA.

Chicago White Sox
On August 9, 2008, Ramírez was traded to the Chicago White Sox for outfielder Paulo Orlando.

Kansas City Royals
On December 11, 2008, Ramírez signed a one-year deal with the Kansas City Royals. On June 6, he was designated for assignment by the Royals.

Washington Nationals
After his release from Kansas City, on June 15, 2009, Ramírez signed a minor league deal with the Washington Nationals.

San Francisco Giants
On February 1, 2010, Ramírez signed a minor league contract with the San Francisco Giants.

Los Angeles Angels of Anaheim
On March 11, 2011, Ramírez signed a minor league deal with the Los Angeles Angels of Anaheim. On July 20, 2011, the Angels purchased Ramírez's contract.  He worked out of the bullpen once again but was not effective, going 1–0 while allowing 16 hits in nine innings and recording a 6.00 ERA in 12 games. He became a free agent after the season.

Kia Tigers
On February 20, 2012, Ramírez signed with Kia Tigers of the Korea Baseball Organization.

Chicago Cubs
On August 17, 2012, Ramirez signed with the Chicago Cubs after being released by the Kia Tigers.

World Baseball Classic
On January 18, 2013, Ramirez was part of the Mexico roster in the World Baseball Classic.

Lancaster Barnstormers
On June 14, 2013, Ramirez signed with the Lancaster Barnstormers.

Return to Atlanta Braves as a coach
On March 10, 2014, the Braves announced that Ramirez would be joining their coaching staff as a coaching assistant.  He was brought on to assist the coaching staff with on-field duties prior to games and manage the Braves instant replay protocol from an off-field location during games.

Toros de Tijuana
On March 5, 2016, Ramírez began a professional comeback signed with the Toros de Tijuana of the Mexican Baseball League. Starting 21 games for Tijuana, he logged a 6-4 record and 4.15 ERA with 49 strikeouts in 102.0 innings pitched. In 2017, Ramírez started 11 games, posting a 4-3 record and 4.06 ERA with 25 strikeouts in 62.0 innings of work. He started 12 games, appearing in 16, for Tijuana the following year, recording a 3-2 record and 3.94 ERA with 28 strikeouts in 64.0 innings pitched. 

For the 2019 season, Ramírez made 32 appearances for the Toros, pitching to a 4-0 record and 2.60 ERA with 9 strikeouts in 34.2 innings of work. He did not play in a game in 2020 due to the cancellation of the LMB season because of the COVID-19 pandemic. On June 8, 2021, Ramírez re-signed with the Toros. He made 12 appearances (10 starts) for Tijuana in 2021, working to a 3-3 record and 4.50 ERA with 17 strikeouts in 50.0 innings pitched. He did not play in a game for the team in 2022 and was released on January 19, 2023.

Coaching career
In 2023, Ramírez was announced as the bullpen coach for Team México in the 2023 World Baseball Classic.

References

External links

Career statistics and player information from Korea Baseball Organization

1979 births
Living people
American baseball players of Mexican descent
American expatriate baseball players in Mexico
American expatriate baseball players in South Korea
Arizona League Mariners players
Atlanta Braves coaches
Atlanta Braves players
Baseball players from California
Chicago White Sox players
Criollos de Caguas players
Eugene Emeralds players
Greenville Braves players
Fresno Grizzlies players
Gulf Coast Braves players
Iowa Cubs players
Kansas City Royals players
Kia Tigers players
KBO League pitchers
Lancaster Barnstormers players
Liga de Béisbol Profesional Roberto Clemente pitchers
Los Angeles Angels players
Macon Braves players
Major League Baseball pitchers
Mexican League baseball pitchers
Myrtle Beach Pelicans players
Omaha Royals players
People from Carson, California
Richmond Braves players
Rome Braves players
Salt Lake Bees players
Seattle Mariners players
Baseball players from Atlanta
Syracuse Chiefs players
Tacoma Rainiers players
Team USA players
Tigres de Quintana Roo players
Toros del Este players
American expatriate baseball players in the Dominican Republic
Venados de Mazatlán players
Toros de Tijuana players
2013 World Baseball Classic players
2019 WBSC Premier12 players
Inglewood High School (California) alumni